When and Where is the third studio album by the American country music band Confederate Railroad. It was issued by Atlantic Records in 1995. The album includes the singles "When and Where", "Bill's Laundromat, Bar and Grill", "When He Was My Age" and "See Ya." Although "When and Where" was a number 24 hit on Billboard Hot Country Singles & Tracks (now Hot Country Songs) in mid-1995, the other three singles all missed Top 40.

Content
"My Baby's Lovin'" was later released as a single by Daryle Singletary on his 1998 album Ain't It the Truth, and "Oh No" was also recorded by 4 Runner on their self-titled debut album. "Toss a Little Bone" was later included on Confederate Railroad's 2000 compilation album Rockin' Country Party Pack, and it charted at number 71 that year.

Track listing

Personnel
Compiled from liner notes.

Confederate Railroad
Jimmy Dormire – electric guitar
Mark Dufresne – drums
Chris McDaniels – keyboards
Gates Nichols – steel guitar
Wayne Secrest – bass guitar
Danny Shirley – lead vocals, acoustic guitar

Additional musicians
Eddie Bayers - drums
Barry Beckett – keyboards
Mike Lawler – acoustic guitar, synthesizer
"Cowboy" Eddie Long – steel guitar
Terry McMillan – percussion
Phil Naish – synthesizer
Louis Nunley – background vocals
Bobby Ogdin – keyboards
Michael Rhodes – bass guitar
Brent Rowan – electric guitar
Mike Severs – electric guitar
Harry Stinson – background vocals
Billy Joe Walker, Jr. – acoustic guitar
Hurshel Wiginton – background vocals
Dennis Wilson – background vocals
Curtis "Mr. Harmony" Young – background vocals

Horns by Jim Horn, Charles Rose, Jim Hoke, Michael Haynes

Chart performance

References

1995 albums
Atlantic Records albums
Confederate Railroad albums
Albums produced by Barry Beckett